Laura Black may refer to:

Laura Black, pseudonym of British novelist Roger Longrigg (1929–2000)
Richard Farley (born 1948), American mass murderer who stalked and shot Laura Black